British Medical Bulletin is a quarterly peer-reviewed general medical journal that publishes review articles on a wide variety of medical subjects. The journal was established in 1943 and is published by Oxford University Press. The editor-in-chief is Norman Vetter (Cardiff University). According to the Journal Citation Reports, the journal has a 2020 impact factor of 4.291.

References

External links

Publications established in 1943
General medical journals
Oxford University Press academic journals
Quarterly journals
Review journals
English-language journals
Online-only journals